Thelymitra magnifica, commonly called the Crystal Brook sun orchid, is a species of orchid in the family Orchidaceae and is endemic to a small area in the south-west of Western Australia. It has a single erect, flat, leathery leaf and up to eight crowded, dark golden brown flowers with yellow streaks and blotches. The column has broad, deeply fringed, yellow or brownish wings.

Description
The labellum (the lowest petal) is narrower than the other petals and sepals. The lobe on the top of the anther has a short lobe on its top. The flowers are insect pollinated and open on sunny days. Flowering occurs in September and October.

Taxonomy and naming
Thelymitra magnifica was first formally described in 2006 by Jeff Jeanes from a specimen collected near Crystal Brook and the description was published in Muelleria. The specific epithet (magnifica) is derived from the Latin words fuscus meaning "noble", "eminent" or "splendid", alluding to the flowers of this orchid.

Distribution and habitat
The Crystal Brook sun orchid grows with wandoo trees on escarpment slopes between Gooseberry Hill and Armadale in the Jarrah Forest and Swan Coastal Plain biogeographic regions.

Conservation
Thelymitra magnifica is classified as "Priority One" by the Government of Western Australia Department of Parks and Wildlife meaning that it is known from only one or a few locations which are potentially at risk.

References

External links
 Volunteer surveys for Crystal Brook star orchid - Thelymitra magnifica

magnifica
Endemic orchids of Australia
Orchids of Western Australia
Plants described in 2006